The 1791 English cricket season was the 20th in which matches have been awarded retrospective first-class cricket status and the fifth after the foundation of the Marylebone Cricket Club. The season saw 14 top-class matches played in the country.

Matches 
A total of 14 top-class matches were played during the season. These included matches played by teams from Hampshire, Kent, Middlesex and Surrey as well as by club sides at Hornchurch in Essex and Brighton in Sussex. MCC played seven first-class matches. Other teams included England sides, the Gentlemen of Kent and Old Etonians.

A number of matches below top-level were played, including the first by a team from Leicestershire.

First mentions
Players who made their first appearances in 1791 included Lord Frederick Beauclerk, who went on to be an influential, albeit controversial, figure in the development of MCC, and Charles Cumberland.

References

Further reading
 
 
 
 

1791 in English cricket
English cricket seasons in the 18th century